Franco dei Russi (Mantua, 15th century) was an Italian painter, active in field of manuscript illumination.

Biografia 
Franco dei Russi was a manuscript illustrator in the Early Renaissance above all active in Lombardy from 1450 to 1482.

In 1450 he participated in the creation of the Bible of Borso d'Este, considered one of the great Italian projects of illuminated manuscripts. The work took six years (1455–61) by a group of artists guided by Taddeo Crivelli

He also worked in Venice for the library of Federico da Montefeltro in Urbino (1474-1482).

Note

External links

 Short biography and bibliography, by the Vatican Library

15th-century deaths
15th-century births
15th-century Italian painters
Painters from Mantua